Michael Joseph McNally (June 29, 1860 – November 2, 1916) was a United States Marine Sergeant who received the Medal of Honor for actions during the Second Samoan Civil War. McNally was part of a joint British, American and Samoan expedition against Samoan rebels on Upolu, Samoa in mid-1899. He fought at the First Battle of Vailele on April 1, 1899, and was subsequently awarded the Medal of Honor along with Private Henry L. Hulbert.

McNally joined the Marine Corps from Mare Island, California in December 1897, and retired in January 1915. On the night of 1 and 2 November 1916, he disappeared from a Baltimore Steam Packet Company steamer; his body was recovered some three weeks later, and he was buried in Portsmouth, Virginia.

Medal of Honor citation
Rank and organization: Sergeant, U.S. Marine Corps. Born: June 29, 1860, New York, N.Y. Accredited to: California. G.O. No.: 55, July 19, 1901.
Citation:
For distinguished conduct in the presence of the enemy at Samoa, Philippine Islands, 1 April 1899.

See also
List of Medal of Honor recipients

List of people who disappeared mysteriously at sea

References

Awards

Note
McNally is sometimes erroneously referred to as Michael L. McNally.

1860 births
1910s missing person cases
1916 deaths
Formerly missing people
Military personnel from New York City
Missing person cases in the United States
People who died at sea
Samoan Civil War recipients of the Medal of Honor
United States Marine Corps Medal of Honor recipients
United States Marines